Pedro Madeira (born 11 November 1992 in Vendas Novas, Portugal) is a Portuguese singer. He represented Portugal at the Junior Eurovision Song Contest 2006 with the song "Deixa-me sentir".

Discography

Albums
 Dá-me a tua mão (2007)
 Viagem (2009)
 Onze (2012)
 De Lisboa para ti (2014)

Singles
 "Deixa-me sentir" (2006)
 "Descobre-me" (2009)
 "Tempo para viver" (2010)
 "Inflamável" (2012)
 "Dueto" (2012)
 "O Rapaz do Piano" (2012)
 "A Lenda" (2013)
 "Aprendiz" (2013)
 "LX" (2014)
 "Relógio" (2015)

See also
 Portugal in the Junior Eurovision Song Contest

External links
 

21st-century Portuguese male singers
1992 births
Living people
Junior Eurovision Song Contest entrants